Handel was the code-name for the UK's national attack warning system in the Cold War. It consisted of a small console with two microphones, lights and gauges. The reason behind this was to provide a back-up if anything failed.

If an enemy airstrike was detected, a key on the left-hand side of the console would be turned and two lights would come on. Then the operator would press and hold down a red button and give the message:

The message would be sent to the police by the telephone system used for the speaking clock, who would in turn activate the air attack sirens using the local telephone lines.  The rationale was to tackle two problems at once, as it reduced running costs (it would most likely be used only once in its working life, though it was regularly tested) and the telephone lines were continually tested for readiness by sharing infrastructure with a public service.  This meant a fault could be detected in time to give a warning.

A Handel warning console can be seen at the Imperial War Museum in London among their Cold War exhibits, alongside the warning apparatus used by Kent Police (which was located at Maidstone police station to activate the sirens).

See also
BIKINI state
Four-minute warning
National Emergency Alarm Repeater

References

External links 
 An explanation of how the system worked

Cold War military equipment of the United Kingdom
Civil defense
Emergency management in the United Kingdom
United Kingdom nuclear command and control
Emergency population warning systems
Cold War military history of the United Kingdom
Color codes